The following is a list of notable people associated with Kansas State University, whose main campus is located in the American city of Manhattan, Kansas.

University presidents
The following men have served as President of Kansas State University:
 Joseph Denison, 1863–1873
 John Anderson, 1873–1879
 George Fairchild, 1879–1897
 Thomas Elmer Will, 1897–1899
 Ernest Reuben Nichols, 1899–1909
 Henry J. Waters, 1909–1917
 William Jardine, 1918–1925
 Francis D. Farrell, 1925–1943
 Milton Eisenhower, 1943–1950+
 James A. McCain, 1950–1975
 Duane C. Acker, 1975–1986
 Jon Wefald, 1986–2009
 Kirk Schulz, 2009–2016
 Richard Myers, 2016–2022+
 Richard Linton, 2022–Present 
+Kansas State alumnus

Alumni

Academia

 Anna Estelle Arnold (1879–1942) – school teacher, administrator, textbook publisher
 Erle Bartley – professor (1949–1983); developed widely used preventative for ruminal tympany (ruminant bloat)
 May Louise Cowles – researcher and nationwide advocate of home economics study
 Kenneth S. Davis – historian, professor, nominated for National Book Award
 Milton S. Eisenhower – former president of Kansas State, Penn State, and Johns Hopkins universities; brother of Dwight D. Eisenhower
 Leon Quincy Jackson (1926/1927–1995) (M.S. 1954) – , American architect, professor at Tennessee State University, and an early African American architect in Oklahoma and Tennessee
 Charlotte P. Morris (PhD) – interim president of Tuskegee University (2010; 2017–2018) 
 Ernest Fox Nichols – physicist, president of Dartmouth College (1909–16) and MIT (1921–23)
 Michael O'Donnell – professor, researcher on adolescent wellness
 George P. "Bud" Peterson – President of the Georgia Institute of Technology (2009–present); chancellor of the University of Colorado-Boulder (2006–09)
 Imam Prasodjo – professor at the University of Indonesia
 John Brooks Slaughter – Chancellor of University System of Maryland (1982–88), president of Occidental College (1988–99), director of the National Science Foundation
 Jackie Vietti – President of Butler Community College for 17 years; interim president of Emporia State University in 2015

Arts and media
 Kirstie Alley – actress (Cheers, Veronica's Closet, Fat Actress); winner of two Emmy Awards
 Craig Bolerjack – announcer on NFL on CBS; Utah Jazz television announcer
 Charles L. Brainard – architect; active in preserving the papers of Dwight D. Eisenhower and establishing the Dwight D. Eisenhower Presidential Library, Museum and Boyhood Home
 Jane Butel – cookbook author; founder of the Jane Butel Cooking School
 Bill Buzenberg – journalist; executive director of Center for Public Integrity; former vice-president of news at NPR
 Del Close – actor, improviser, writer; co-founder of I.O. theatre in Chicago and one of premier influences on modern improvisational theater
 Lucinda Dickey – actress (Breakin', Breakin' 2: Electric Boogaloo), former Solid Gold dancer
 Roy M. Fisher – journalist; former Editor-in-Chief of Chicago Daily News
 Gail Gregg – artist
 Eddie Griffin – comedian
 Mitch Holthus – radio voice of Kansas City Chiefs
 Gordon Jump – actor (WKRP in Cincinnati, "Maytag Man")
 Charles Melton – actor
 Virgil Miller – film special effects pioneer; Academy Award nominee
 Clementine Paddleford – journalist and food writer; declared by Time magazine in 1953 as the "best known food editor in the United States"
 Darcy Pattison – writer of children's literature, blogger, writing teacher and indie publisher.
 Steve Pepoon – TV writer/producer; Emmy winner, The Simpsons
 Steve Physioc – broadcaster for the Kansas City Royals
 Keylee Sue Sanders – television fashion consultant; former Miss Teen USA; pageant organizer
 Lawrence M. Schoen – science fiction author
 Mark Schultz – musician
 Kevin Warren Sloan - student athlete; landscape architect, urban planner and writer
 Crystal Smith – model, actress, and Playboy centerfold
Pete Souza – photojournalist and official White House photographer (1983–1989); chief White House photographer (2009–present)
 Eric Stonestreet – actor (Modern Family), Emmy Award winner
Theresa Vail – Miss Kansas 2013
 Jerry Wexler – record producer; enshrined in Rock and Roll Hall of Fame

English/creative writing
 Derick Burleson – poet
 Frank Marshall Davis – poet; journalist; editor of several African-American newspapers
 Darren DeFrain – fiction writer
 Taylor Mali – slam poet
 Claude McKay – poet influential during Harlem Renaissance
 Debra Monroe – fiction writer
 Bryan Penberthy – poet
 Kevin Rabas – poet
 Ed Skoog – poet

Business
 Leanne Caret – President and CEO of Boeing Defense, Space & Security
 James Harbord – Major General during World War I; president and chairman of the board for RCA
Damon T. Hininger – chief executive officer of the Corrections Corporation of America.
Carl Ice – President (2010–14) and President and CEO (2014–20) of BNSF Railway 
 Jim Isch – officer at NCAA; interim executive director of NCAA (2009–2010)
 Dakota Bartell - President of DBMetals (2015–Present)
 William A. Porter – founder of E-Trade
 Warren Staley – President and CEO, Cargill, Inc.
 Gregory C. Case - CEO of Aon

Politics, government and military
 Emory S. Adams – United States Army general
 Joseph Boakai – Vice President of Liberia (2006–2018)
 Sam Brownback – U.S. Senator, Kansas (1996–2011), 46th governor of Kansas (2011–2018)
 Donald M. Campbell Jr. – Commanding general of U.S. Army Recruiting Command in Fort Knox
 John W. Carlin – 40th governor of Kansas; Archivist of the United States (1995–2005)
 Glen E. Edgerton – Major General, U.S. Army
 Marlin Fitzwater – Press Secretary under Ronald Reagan and George H. W. Bush
Kenji Fujimori – Peruvian businessman and Congressman
Jim Geringer – 30th governor of Wyoming
 Mike Hayden – 41st governor of Kansas
 Lori Healey – Commissioner of the Chicago Department of Planning and Development
 Lynn Jenkins – Kansas State Treasurer (2002–08), U.S. House of Representatives (2009–2019)
 Ronald E. Keys – General, U.S. Air Force

 Richard A. Knobloch – Brigadier General, U.S. Air Force
 Henry D. Linscott – Lieutenant General, U.S. Marine Corps
 Roger Marshall – junior United States senator from Kansas
 Michael A. McAuliffe – Brigadier General, U.S. Air Force
 Frank B. Morrison – 31st governor of Nebraska (1961–67)
 Richard Myers – Chairman of the U.S. Joint Chiefs of Staff (2001–2005)
 Richard Bordeaux Parker – diplomat
 John Jacob Rhodes – Minority Leader of the U.S. House of Representatives (1973–1981)
 Pat Roberts – U.S. Senator, Kansas (1996–2020)
 Bernard W. Rogers – NATO Supreme Allied Commander
 Glenn Rogers – Member of the Texas House of Representatives (2021–Present)
 Susanna M. Salter – Mayor of Argonia, Kansas (1887); first female mayor in the United States
 Fred Andrew Seaton – U.S. Senator, Nebraska (1951–1952); U.S. Secretary of the Interior (1956–1961)
 K. Gary Sebelius – Magistrate judge of the United States District Court for the District of Kansas
 Harold Sebring – Chief Justice of the Florida Supreme Court, American judge at the Nuremberg Trials, Dean of the Stetson University College of Law, and head coach of the Florida Gators football team
 Richard J. Seitz – Lieutenant General, U.S. Army
 Theresa Sparks – President of the San Francisco Police Commission
 John Strick - Member of the Kansas State Senate (1985-1992)
 Virginia Trotter – U.S. Assistant Secretary of Education (1974–1977)
 Allen West – U.S. House of Representatives from Florida's 22nd district (2011–2013)

Science and technology
 Mark Alfred Carleton – botanist
Peter Tsai - inventor of N95 mask
David Fairchild – botanist and explorer
 Paul C. Fisher – inventor
 Philip Fox – astronomer
 Alwyn Howard Gentry – botanist
 Luis Montaner – HIV/AIDS researcher
 Nellie M. Payne – entomologist and agricultural chemist
 Elieser Posner — grain scientist
 Geraldine L. Richmond – physical chemist; National Medal of Science laureate
 Lloyd Carlton Stearman – aircraft designer
 Charles Hazelius Sternberg – paleontologist
 Walter Tennyson Swingle – botanist
 Samuel Wendell Williston – paleontologist

Athletics

Baseball
 Elden Auker – All-American (1932); All-Big Six Conference in football, basketball, and baseball; played for Detroit Tigers 
 Josh Billings – 11-year Major League Baseball veteran
 Ted Power – 12-year Major League Baseball veteran
 Bobby Randall – played for Minnesota Twins (1976–80), former head baseball coach at Iowa State University (1985-1995), former head baseball coach at University of Kansas (1996-2002)
 Andy Replogle – pitcher for Milwaukee Brewers 
 Kite Thomas – outfielder for Philadelphia Athletics, Washington Senators; namesake of Kite's Bar in Manhattan, Kansas 
 Carlos Torres – pitcher for Chicago White Sox 
 Craig Wilson – All-American (1992); member of the 1992 Olympic baseball team in Barcelona; played for Chicago White Sox
 Earl Woods – father of Tiger Woods; broke color barrier in baseball in the Big Seven Conference at Kansas State

Basketball

 Ernie Barrett – first-round pick in 1951 NBA Draft (Boston Celtics), former athletic director at Kansas State, number retired by KSU 
 Michael Beasley – active NBA player, All-American and Big 12 Conference Player of the Year (2008), second overall selection in the 2008 NBA Draft 
 Rolando Blackman – College Basketball Hall of Famer, All-American (1981), first-round pick in 1981 NBA Draft (Dallas Mavericks), four-time NBA All-Star 
 Bob Boozer – College Basketball Hall of Famer, two-time All-American (1958, 1959), first overall draft pick in 1959 NBA Draft (Cincinnati Royals), NBA All-Star
 Bob Chipman – former basketball coach at Washburn University; team won 1986–1987 NAIA national championship
Norris Coleman (born 1961) - NBA forward for the Los Angeles Clippers, 1994 Israeli Basketball Premier League MVP
 Mike Evans – two-time Big Eight Conference Player of the Year (1977, 1978), first-round pick in 1978 NBA Draft (Denver Nuggets), NBA executive and coach 
 Bill Guthridge – former basketball coach at the University of North Carolina at Chapel Hill, National Coach of the Year (1998) 
 Gene Keady – former basketball coach at Purdue, four-time National Coach of the Year (1984, 1994, 1996, 2000) 
 Lon Kruger – basketball coach at Oklahoma, former coach of Atlanta Hawks, two-time Big Eight Conference Player of the Year (1973, 1974) 
 Rodney McGruder – active NBA player (Los Angeles Clippers)
 Willie Murrell – led KSU to Final Four in 1964, former ABA basketball player, number retired by KSU 
 Nicole Ohlde – three-time All-American (2002, 2003, 2004), first-round pick in 2004 WNBA Draft, number retired by KSU 
 Jacob Pullen – all-time scoring leader for KSU (2,132 career points), winner of Frances Pomeroy Naismith Award
 Mitch Richmond – Naismith Hall of Fame, All-American (1988), first-round pick in 1988 NBA Draft, six-time NBA All-Star, NBA All-Star Game MVP
 Howie Shannon – All-American (1948), first overall draft pick in 1949 BAA Draft (Providence Steamrollers) 
 Juan "Pachín" Vicens – named "Best Basketball Player in the World" in 1959
 Kendra Wecker – All-American and Big 12 Conference Player of the Year (2005), first-round pick in 2005 WNBA Draft (San Antonio Silver Stars), number retired by KSU
 D.J. Johnson (basketball) -
 Tex Winter- Former KSU basketball coach, Innovator of the Triangle Offense

Football

 Elijah Alexander – NFL linebacker; founder of the Tackle Cancer Foundation 
 David Allen – All-American (1998); NFL kick returner 
 Michael Bishop – Davey O'Brien Award winner; second in voting for 1998 Heisman Trophy; All-American (1998) 
 Larry Brown – 1972 NFL MVP; four-time NFL Pro Bowler 
 Russ Campbell – former NFL tight end for the Pittsburgh Steelers
 Chris Canty – two-time All-American (1995, 1996); first-round pick in 1997 NFL Draft
 Henry Childs – NFL Pro Bowler 
 Paul Coffman – three-time NFL Pro Bowler; member of Green Bay Packers Hall of Fame 
 Tyrone Crews – CFL linebacker, Grey Cup champion, BC Lions Wall of Fame 
 Ron Dickerson – head football coach for Temple University
 Darrell Dickey – head football coach for University of North Texas 
 Lynn Dickey – NFL quarterback; named all-time All-Big Eight QB in 1996; member of Green Bay Packers Hall of Fame
 Josh Freeman – NFL quarterback; first-round draft pick in 2009 NFL Draft
 Ralph Graham – starter in 1934 East-West Shrine Game; head football coach for Kansas State
 Martín Gramática – Lou Groza Award winner; All-American (1997); NFL Pro Bowler 
 Dean Griffing – Canadian Football Hall of Famer; first general manager of Denver Broncos
 Steve Grogan – NFL quarterback; member of New England Patriots Hall of Fame 
 Kirby Hocutt – athletic director at Texas Tech University, Chairman of College Football Playoff Committee (2016– )
 Jason Johnson – former Indianapolis Colts player
 Tony Jordan – NFL running back of Phoenix Cardinals
 Jeff Kelly – All-American (1998); former NFL linebacker 
 Collin Klein – Big XII Offensive Player of the Year 2012; Johnny Unitas Golden Arm Award 2012; third in voting for 2012 Heisman Trophy
 Tyler Lockett – NFL wide receiver for the Seattle Seahawks selected for the 2016 Pro Bowl 
 Jeron Mastrud – NFL tight end (Miami Dolphins) 
 Jaime Mendez – All-American (1993); holds KSU record for most interceptions in a season (15)
 Ralph McFillen – player 1960–1963; NCAA conference commissioner
 Jordy Nelson – All-American (2007); NFL wide receiver (Green Bay Packers) 
 Quentin Neujahr – NFL center
 Terence Newman – Jim Thorpe Award winner; unanimous All-American (2002); first-round pick in 2003 NFL Draft 
 Gary Patterson – head football coach at TCU 
 Ellis Rainsberger – head football coach for Kansas State University and Pittsburgh Maulers
 Doug Russell – led NFL in rushing in 1935
 Clarence Scott – All-American (1970); NFL Pro Bowler 
 Harold L. "Tom" Sebring – Head football coach for the University of Florida (1925–1927) 
 Mark Simoneau – All-American (1999); Big 12 Player of the Year; former NFL linebacker 
 Sean Snyder – All-American (1992); son of coach Bill Snyder 
 Gary Spani – All-American (1977); Member of College Football Hall of Fame and Kansas City Chiefs Hall of Fame
 Darren Sproles – All-American (2003); NFL running back; selected as one of "Fifty Greatest San Diego Chargers" 
 Bob Stull – athletic director at UTEP 
 Veryl Switzer – NFL running back; highest NFL draft pick in KSU history (#4 in 1954)
 Daniel Thomas – NFL running back
 Brent Venables, (class of 1992),  current head football coach at Oklahoma
 James J. Yeager – head football coach for Iowa State University and the University of Colorado

Golf
 Jim Colbert – finished second at NCAA Championships; registered 8 victories on PGA Tour and 20 victories on Champions Tour; golf television analyst
 Robert Streb – PGA golfer
 Aaron Watkins – PGA golfer

Track and field

 Thane Baker – winner of four Olympic medals, including gold, at 1952 Summer Olympics and 1956 Summer Olympics
Tom Brosius – All-American in shot put and discus
 DeLoss Dodds – Big Seven champion; Kansas State track coach (1963–1976); U.S. Track and Field and Cross Country Coaches Association Hall of Fame
 Steve Fritz – Big Eight champion; finished fourth in decathlon at 1996 Summer Olympics; assistant coach at Kansas State
 Kenny Harrison – won gold medal in triple jump at 1996 Summer Olympics 
 Thomas Randolph – two-sport All-American (1992)
 Ivan Riley – won bronze medal in 400 meter hurdles at 1924 Summer Olympics
 Austra Skujytė – won silver medal in heptathlon (for Lithuania) at 2004 Summer Olympics; assistant coach at Kansas State

Others
 Erin Brockovich – activist
 Sean Lowe – reality star (The Bachelorette, The Bachelor, Dancing with the Stars)
 Jim Rayburn – founder of Young Life
 Kevin Saunders – wheelchair Olympian

Faculty and staff
Stephen Ambrose – professor of history (1970–71)
Helen Brockman – fashion designer (1968–74)
Helen Stuart Campbell – professor of domestic science (1896–97)
Elizabeth Williams Champney – secretary of college, drawing instructor (1870–73)
John Ciardi – professor of English (poetry)
John Wynn Davidson – first professor of military science (1868–71)
Kenneth S. Davis – professor of history
Michael Finnegan – professor of anthropology
Angelo Garzio, emeritus professor of ceramics
Charles Christian Georgeson – professor of agriculture (1890–98)
Nehemiah Green – professor of military tactics
Roy M. Green – professor; later president of Colorado State University
T. Marshall Hahn – Dean of College of Arts and Sciences (1959–62); later president of Virginia Tech
Pascal Hitzler - professor of computer science (2019–present)
Jonathan Holden – professor of English (poetry) (1978–present)
John S. Hougham – chairman of philosophy and agriculture (1868–72)
 A. S. Hitchcock – professor of botany (1892–1901)
Lloyd Hulbert – professor of biology (1955–86)
William Ashbrook Kellerman – professor of botany (1883–91)
Naomi B. Lynn – professor of political science; later first Hispanic female president of an American public university
George A. Milliken – professor of statistics
W. R. Moses – poet; professor of English
Benjamin Franklin Mudge – Chair of Geology Department (1866–74)
Philip Nel – professor of English (2000–present)
Mitsugi Ohno – glassblower of first successful Klein bottle (1961–96)
 Andrew Summers Rowan – professor of military tactics (1902–03)
Fred Albert Shannon – professor of history; awarded Pulitzer Prize for History in 1929 while teaching at Kansas State
James Shanteau – professor of psychology
Maurice Cole Tanquary – professor of entomology (1913–1919)
Albert M. Ten Eyck – professor of agriculture (1902–06), agronomy (1906–10) and farm management (1910–12)
Michael Wesch – assistant professor of cultural anthropology, recipient of 2008 U.S. Professor of the Year award from CASE
Kimberly A. With – professor of biology

Fictional characters
 Joseph, anti-hero of Bruce Jay Friedman's novel A Mother's Kisses, attends "Kansas Land Grant Agricultural College."
 Mary Ashley, main character in Sidney Sheldon's novel Windmills of the Gods, starts the book as a professor at Kansas State University.
 Brantley Foster, protagonist in the movie The Secret of My Success, portrayed by Michael J. Fox, is a recent graduate of Kansas State University who moves to New York City where he has landed a job as a financier.
 Oliver Lang, terrorist in the movie Arlington Road, portrayed by Tim Robbins, is a former Kansas State student.
 Lamar Quin, senior associate in the John Grisham novel The Firm, is noted to have graduated from Kansas State.

See also

 Lists of people from Kansas

References

Kansas State University people